Han Kuo-Huang is a Chinese-born American ethnomusicologist and musician.

Early life and education 
Han was born in Xiamen (Amoy), China in 1936 and grew up in Taiwan. He obtained his bachelor's degree in Taiwan. In 1960 he assisted Elizabeth (Whittington) Hovhaness, the wife of the American composer Alan Hovhaness, in obtaining recordings of Chinese and Taiwanese music during her trip to Taiwan, and in 1962 served as translator for composer Lou Harrison.

United States 
Han eventually relocated to the United States, and obtained U.S. citizenship. He received both his M.M. and Ph.D. degrees from Northwestern University and served as professor of music for over 30 years at Northern Illinois University in DeKalb, Illinois, retiring in 2003. He is now a professor of music at the University of Kentucky in Lexington, Kentucky.

He specializes in Chinese music as well as gamelan (both Balinese and Javanese) and directs these ensembles, formerly in the Asian Ensemble of Northern Illinois University and now at the University of Kentucky. His Chinese music ensemble from Northern Illinois University, formed in the late 1970s, was the first such ensemble at a North American university, and toured the United States and East Asia.

Han has a particular interest in the subject of music education, with an emphasis on the teaching of Asian musics. He has published widely in both Chinese and English, with twelve books and numerous articles appearing in journals and music reference works, and textbooks.

Han lives in Lexington, Kentucky.

Writings 
 1974 - The Use of the Marian Antiphons in Renaissance Motets. Ph.D. dissertation. Evanston, Illinois: Northwestern University.
 1992 - The Lion's Roar: Chinese Luogu Percussion Ensembles. Book and CD set. Danbury, Connecticut: World Music Press.

Discography 
1981 - West Meets East: Chinese and Balinese Music. Performed by the Asian Music Ensemble, Northern Illinois University; Han Kuo-Huang, director. LP. New York: Folkways Records. Recorded in the Recital Hall, Music Building, Northern Illinois University, DeKalb. Side 1, band 1, and side 2, band 1, were recorded in December 1980; all other pieces were recorded in December 1978.

References

External links 
Han Kuo-Huang page from University of Kentucky site

Hokkien people
Ethnomusicologists
Northern Illinois University faculty
Bienen School of Music alumni
Musicians from Lexington, Kentucky
Taiwanese emigrants to the United States
University of Kentucky faculty
People from Xiamen
Year of birth missing (living people)
Living people
American people of Chinese descent
Taiwanese people from Fujian
Chinese Civil War refugees
People with acquired American citizenship